Bhapa pitha is a type of rice cake mainly from the eastern part of South Asia, which includes Bangladesh,Nepal, Bhutan and Northeast India. Bhapa pitha is considered to be a traditional winter dish in Bangladesh. It is a steamed rice cake made out of freshly ground rice flour. The filling is composed of coconut, and molasses or brown sugar . Molasses can be substituted with brown sugar syrup or jaggery. In Bangladesh bhapa pitha is eaten in December

Ingredients 
 Ground rice flour
 Molasses
 Coconuts

See also
 Chunga Pitha

References 

Bengali cuisine
Bangladeshi desserts
Indian desserts
Steamed foods
Rice cakes
Pitha